The German Future Prize award is considered one of the most prestigious conferred for science and innovation within Germany. The award is worth 250,000 euros and is supported by numerous sponsors.

This prize has been awarded to various exceptional individuals since 1997.

The award winners and their projects

References

External links
 

German awards
Science and technology awards